FC OPA (FC Oulun Pallo) is a football club from Oulu, Finland. In 2009 it plays in the third highest tier in the C-Group of Kakkonen.

The club was founded in 2005. OPA started from Vitonen (the sixth highest tier) and was promoted three times in a row after every season from 2005 to 2007. FC OPA plays its home matches in the Castren Sports Center in the Välivainio district of Oulu. The head coach of FC OPA is Ville Väisänen.

External links
 FC OPA official homepage

Football clubs in Finland
Association football clubs established in 2005
2005 establishments in Finland